Dipankar is a given name in Assam and West Bengal. It means "One who has the lamp in his hands or part of deep means light". People having this name are generally considered to be male.

Notable people with this name 
 Deepankar De
 Dipankar Banerjee
 Dipankar Bhattacharjee
 Dipankar Das Sarma
 Dipankar Datta
 Dipankar Gupta
 Dipankar Home
 Dipankar Srijnan Atisha
 Swami Dipankar (spiritual leader)

Indian masculine given names